The Women's Building is a women-led non-profit arts and education community center located in San Francisco, California, which advocates self-determination, gender equality and social justice.  The four-story building rents to multiple tenants and serves over 20,000 women a year. The building has served as an event and meeting space since 1979, when it was purchased by the San Francisco Women's Center. The building is shielded from rising real estate costs in the Mission district because that group has owned the building since 1995.

The building has been listed as one of the National Register of Historic Places since April 30, 2018; and was listed on the San Francisco Designated Landmark since March 1, 1985.

Pre-history of The Women's Building 

The structure was built in 1910 by architect August Reinhold Denke, for the German Turnverein exercise movement. It retained the name Mission Turn Hall until 1935, but was also used by other organizations of various ethnicities including the Native Sons and Daughters of the Golden West. It also known as the Mission Turn-Verein Hall. 

In 1935, it was acquired by the Sons and Daughters of Norway, and subsequently was known as Dovre Hall, before taking its current name in 1978.

History 
The San Francisco Women's Center began in 1973. By 1974, it hired its first full-time employee and had moved into a small storefront office. In 1976, its difficulty in locating a venue for the national conference on Violence Against Women it was organizing with other women's groups led it to search for a permanent space. Through 1978 and 1979, it raised funds to put down an initial $10,000 deposit, and then a $115,000 first payment towards the $535,000 purchase price of the building at 3543 18th Street.

"Becoming Visible: The First Black Lesbian Conference" was held at the Women's Building, from October 17 to 19, 1980. It has been credited as the first conference for African-American lesbian women.

Tracy Gary, one of the organizers of the Violence Against Women conference, and co-founder of the Women's Building, along with co-founder Marya Grambs and Women's Building staff member Carmen Vázquez, were interviewed in 1982 by Julia Randall for KPFA for the building's 3rd birthday. The women discuss the difficulties of the early years and how the building was being used in 1982. Roma Guy and her partner Diane were also two of the Women's Building's co-founders.

In the first year of operation, the Women's Building was targeted by two attacks: an arson fire that caused $50,000 worth of damage, and a pipe bomb set off on the front steps of the building.

In 1997, the Women's Building began to undergo a $5 million renovation prompted by mandatory seismic retrofitting. In the course of that effort, it evicted the Dovre Club, an Irish bar that had been in the corner of the building on 18th and Lapidge Streets since 1979. The original owner of that bar had an oral agreement with the Women's Center that the bar could stay in place during his lifetime; after his death in 1997, the bar made an effort to stay in place but ultimately relocated.

In 2018, the building received a $160,000 grant to retrofit its windows, by winning a vote in a preservation funding contest for historical buildings.

MaestraPeace (1994) mural 

Painted by seven women artists including Juana Alicia, Miranda Bergman, Edythe Boone, Susan Kelk Cervantes (cofounder of Precita Eyes Muralists Association), Meera Desai, Yvonne Littleton and Irene Perez along with their helpers and volunteers in 1994, the mural titled MaestraPeace covers both the outside of The Women's Building as well as the interior entrance hall and stairway.  It features images of feminine icons from history and fiction, and the names of more than 600 women written in calligraphy. According to the San Francisco Women's Center, "This spectacular mural is a culmination of a multi-cultural, multi-generation collaboration of seven women artists, and a colorful work of art that sings to our community."

Many of the original artists returned to the building for an update in 2000, an expansion to the inside of the building in 2010, and a major $130,000 restoration in 2012. That last restoration included a treatment process designed to preserve the colors of the mural for another 100 years.

See also 
 Mujeres Muralistas
 National Register of Historic Places listings in San Francisco

References

External links

Official website
San Francisco Landmark #178, as a San Francisco Designated Landmark
Guide to the San Francisco Women's Building/Women's Centers Records; finding aid for the historic records of the Women's Building (1972–2001) available to researchers at the GLBT Historical Society in San Francisco.
Maestrapeace Artworks Records; finding aid for documentation on the creation of the Maestrapeace mural at the Women's Building available to researchers at the GLBT Historical Society in San Francisco.

Buildings and structures in San Francisco
Community centers in California
Feminism in California
Mission District, San Francisco
Murals in San Francisco
Non-profit organizations based in San Francisco
Buildings and structures completed in 1910
Organizations established in 1973
1973 establishments in California
Feminist art organizations in the United States
National Register of Historic Places in San Francisco